Lattin–Cullen GAA is a Gaelic Athletic Association club which represents the parish villages of Lattin and Cullen in Ireland. The club plays at Hannon GAA Park (opened 2009) which is situated in the village of Lattin, and is an affiliate club of the West Tipperary GAA division. The club has traditionally has been one of the top three senior football clubs in the West Tipperary GAA Division. The club also plays hurling up to the Intermediate grade.

Honours

 Tipperary Intermediate Hurling Championship – 1996
 West Tipperary Senior Hurling Champions – 1963 (as St Patrick's with Solohead)
 West Tipperary Intermediate Hurling Champions – 1983, 1996, 1999, 2014 (as Lattin–Cullen Gaels)
 Tipperary Intermediate Football Championship – 1989
 West Tipperary Senior Football Champions – 1958, 1961, 1964, 1965, 1966, 1967, 1969, 1971, 1982, 1994
 West Tipperary Intermediate Football Championship (2) 1989, 2003
 West Tipperary Junior A Football Championship (1) 1957
 Tipperary Junior A Hurling Championship (1) 1992
 West Tipperary Junior A Hurling Championship (7) 1952, 1963, 1968, 1979, 1989, 1992, 2007
 Tipperary Under-21 A Football Championship (2) 1982 (with Emly), 1985 (with Emly) 
 West Tipperary Under-21 A Football Championship (11) 1961 (with Solohead), 1962 (with Solohead), 1963 (with Solohead), 1964 (with Solohead), 1967, 1982 (with Emly), 1983 (with Emly), 1984 (with Emly), 1985 (with Emly), 1986 (with Emly), 2014 (with Aherlow)
 West Tipperary Under-21 B Football Championship (2) 1992, 2003
 West Tipperary Under-21 C Football Championship (1) 2000
 West Tipperary Under-21 B Hurling Championship (2) 2002, 2015 (as Lattin–Cullen Gaels)
 Tipperary Under-21 C Hurling Championship (1) 2009
 West Tipperary Under-21 C Hurling Championship (2) 2000, 2006
 Tipperary Minor A Football Championship (3) 1963 (with Solohead) as St Patrick's), 1982 (with Emly), 1983 (with Emly)
 West Tipperary Minor A Football Championship (11) 1951 (with Emly), 1956 (with Emly), 1963 (with Solohead) as St Patrick's), 1968 (with Solohead) as St Patrick's), 1975 (with Emly), 1977 (with Emly), 1981 (with Emly), 1982 (with Emly), 1983 (with Emly), 1987 (with Emly), 2012 (with Aherlow)
 West Tipperary Minor B Football Championship (2) 1995, 2001
 West Tipperary Minor C Football Championship (3) 2003, 2006, 2007
 West Tipperary Minor A Hurling Championship (3) 1954 (with Emly), 1963 (with Solohead), 1983 (with Emly)
 West Tipperary Minor B Hurling Championship (1) 2000
 Tipperary Minor C Hurling Championship (1) 2008
 West Tipperary Minor C Hurling Championship (2) 2007, 2008

Famous players
 Nicky English
 Ger Maguire
 Mark Russell

References

External links 

West Tipperary GAA site

Gaelic games clubs in County Tipperary
Hurling clubs in County Tipperary
Gaelic football clubs in County Tipperary